Denis Rich  (born 26 October 1954) is a former Australian rules football field umpire in the Australian Football League (AFL). 

His colleague that day was Ian Robinson. Rich went on to co-officiate in 251 senior VFL/AFL games, including three Grand Finals - in 1990, 1992 and 1994.

Besides umpiring football at the highest level, Rich also served a long career with the Metropolitan Fire Service (MFS). In 2006 it was reported that Rich was going to Antarctica to take up the position of Station Leader at Casey Station.

References

Living people
Australian Football League umpires
1954 births